Ken Nishimura (born 31 December 1995) is a Japanese karateka. He won the gold medal in the men's kumite 75 kg event at the 2019 Asian Karate Championships held in Tashkent, Uzbekistan. He represented Japan at the 2020 Summer Olympics in karate. He competed in the men's 75 kg event where he did not advance to compete in the semifinals.

Career 

At the 2016 World University Karate Championships held in Braga, Portugal, he won the silver medal in the men's kumite 75 kg event and the gold medal in the men's team kumite event. A few months later, at the 2016 World Karate Championships held in Linz, Austria, he won the silver medal in the men's team kumite event.

In 2018, he won one of the bronze medals in the men's kumite 75 kg and men's team kumite events at the World Karate Championships held in Madrid, Spain.

Achievements

References

External links 

 

Living people
Place of birth missing (living people)
Japanese male karateka
Karateka at the 2020 Summer Olympics
1995 births
Olympic karateka of Japan
21st-century Japanese people